The Czechoslovakia women's national football team was the national women's association football representing Czechoslovakia. It was established in 1968, in the midst of the Prague Spring, making it one of the pioneering women's football national teams.

Czechoslovakia's first game was played on February 23 that year in Viareggio, Italy against the also debuting Italian team, and resulted in a 2–1 loss. In 1970 Czechoslovakia registered in the first unofficial attempt at a World Cup, and it was scheduled to make its debut on July 7 in Bologna against Denmark. However, the team was not granted a visa to travel to the Western Bloc and had to withdraw. The same happened the following year.

Czechoslovakia's first official women's match took place in the Bratislava's Stadium Petržalka in 1985, ending in a 2–2 draw against Hungary. The team then went two years without a victory in its next seven games.

From October 1987 to November 1988 Czechoslovakia took part for the first time in the qualifying of the still unofficial European Championship. In the mid-time it took part in June 1988 in the China-based 1988 FIFA Women's Invitation Tournament, an essay for the first official World Cup three years later, where it failed to progress to the quarter-finals despite defeating Japan and drawing with impending powerhouse United States. In the European Championship Czechoslovakia was defeated by West Germany in the last qualifying round.

Through 1989 and 1990 Czechoslovakia played the first official European Championship's qualification, which also served as a qualifying for the 1991 World Cup. This time the team didn't make qualify past the first qualifying stage, ranking third in its group behind Germany and Hungary. In 1991–92 it didn't make it either, losing this time to Italy. This was the team's last appearance as Czechoslovakia was dissolved at the end of 1992. The following saw the foundation of the Czech and Slovak national teams, the former serving as the Czechoslovak team's successor.

Competition record

UEFA Women's Championship

Match History

References

national
Former national association football teams in Europe
European women's national association football teams
Czechoslovakia women's national football team